Ismael Rangel León (born 2 June 1988 in Villarrobledo, Albacete), commonly known as Isma, is a Spanish footballer who plays for CP Villarrobledo as a right winger.

Football career
After arriving in the club's youth system, Isma spent several seasons associated with the reserve team in the fourth division. He made his debut with the main squad on 7 November 2009, playing the last minute of a 3–1 away win against Gimnàstic de Tarragona in the second level championship.

In the 2011 summer, after only three more league appearances with the first team (totalling a further 26 minutes), Isma left Alba and joined amateurs CP Villarrobledo also in his native Castile-La Mancha, going on to remain with the club several seasons.

References

External links
Villarrobledo official profile 

1988 births
Living people
Spanish footballers
Footballers from Castilla–La Mancha
Association football wingers
Segunda División players
Segunda División B players
Tercera División players
Atlético Albacete players
Albacete Balompié players
AD Alcorcón footballers
Arandina CF players